Admir Adrović (born 8 May 1988) is a Montenegrin football forward who plays for FK Podgorica.

Club career
He started his career at FK Berane, breaking into the first-team in 2005. In 2007, he joined Sutjeska Nikšić. After a loan spell at S.C. Damash he joined FK Budućnost Podgorica on a free transfer. During his time at Budućnost, he lifted Montenegrin First League in 2012 and Montenegrin Cup in 2013. He also became league's top scorer two seasons in a row. Budućnost rejected loan offers from UD Las Palmas and Córdoba CF so he joined Pandurii in 2013. He scored his first goal for Pandurii in a 3–0 win against FC Ripensia Timișoara. He rejoined Budućnost in 2014.

After a season with Al-Muharraq, he joined Hong Kong Premier League side Pegasus.

On 29 June 2018, Adrović joined China League One club Dalian Transcendence on a half year contract.

Honours and achievements

Club
Hong Kong FA Cup
Winners: 2015-16

Montenegrin Cup
Winners: 2017–18

Individual
Montenegrin First League top goalscorer: 2011–12, 2012–13
Hong Kong Premier League top goalscorer:  2015–16

References

External links
 

1988 births
Living people
People from Berane
Association football forwards
Montenegrin footballers
Montenegro under-21 international footballers
FK Berane players
FK Sutjeska Nikšić players
Damash Gilan players
FK Budućnost Podgorica players
CS Pandurii Târgu Jiu players
Al-Muharraq SC players
TSW Pegasus FC players
OFK Titograd players
Admir Adrovic
Dalian Transcendence F.C. players
Muscat Club players
Oman Club players
FK Dečić players
Montenegrin Second League players
Montenegrin First League players
Azadegan League players
Liga I players
Bahraini Premier League players
Hong Kong Premier League players
Hong Kong League XI representative players
Admir Adrovic
China League One players
Oman Professional League players
Montenegrin expatriate footballers
Expatriate footballers in Iran
Montenegrin expatriate sportspeople in Iran
Expatriate footballers in Romania
Montenegrin expatriate sportspeople in Romania
Expatriate footballers in Bahrain
Montenegrin expatriate sportspeople in Bahrain
Expatriate footballers in Hong Kong
Montenegrin expatriate sportspeople in Hong Kong
Expatriate footballers in Thailand
Montenegrin expatriate sportspeople in Thailand
Expatriate footballers in China
Montenegrin expatriate sportspeople in China
Expatriate footballers in Oman
Montenegrin expatriate sportspeople in Oman